The Laguna Plata Archeological District is a  historic district in Lea County, New Mexico, near Hobbs, New Mexico, which was listed on the National Register of Historic Places in 1989.  It included 26 contributing sites.

Field investigation was conducted by archeologists in April 2010.  It is a seasonal use camp site which had usage by native people in three periods: 200/400–1100 A.D., 1100–1300 A.D., and 1300–1450 A.D.

References

Historic districts on the National Register of Historic Places in New Mexico
Lea County, New Mexico
Archaeological sites in New Mexico